Richard James Pannell (born 2 June 1973) is a former English cricketer.  Pannell was a right-handed batsman who bowled right-arm medium pace.  He was born at Bristol.

Pannell represented the Somerset Cricket Board in a single List A match against Wales Minor Counties in the 1st round of the 2001 Cheltenham & Gloucester Trophy at North Perrott Cricket Club Ground.  In his only List A match, he scored 12 runs and took a single catch in the field.  With the ball he took 3 wickets at a bowling average of 7.00, with figures of 3/21.

References

External links
Richard Pannell at Cricinfo
Richard Pannell at CricketArchive

1973 births
Living people
Cricketers from Bristol
English cricketers
Somerset Cricket Board cricketers